BlayzBloo: Super Melee Brawlers Battle Royale, released in Japan as , is a 3D arena fighting video game developed by Arc System Works. It was published in Japan by Arc System Works on January 27, 2010 and for the Nintendo DSi/Nintendo DSi XL. The game was released in North America on August 2, 2010.

Plot 
The game revolves around five characters from original games: Taokaka, Ragna, Rachel, Jin, and Noel, presented in chibi forms. They battle on smaller arenas inspired by the BlazBlue stages, while competing in last-man-standing and capture-the-flag matches.

Gameplay
Set in 3D, Blayzbloo allows for up to four players to fight at the same time. The game is played with the control pad and four buttons (attack, drive attack, jump, and item). Some moves from BlazBlue have carried over. Ragna has a soul eating power, Rachel has a wind attack, Taokaka dash moves, Jin freezing ability, and Noel chain combos.

Aside from a usual, simple attack, there is also a special Drive Move. Stages usually have treasure chests occasionally showing up, which contain items that can be used against the enemies. Unlike the other games in the series, this one does not have blocking feature, which means that attacks have to be avoided. Singleplayer mode has three different sets: Life (last man standing mode), Points (one with the most points win), and Flag (capturing the Panda Flag). There is a separate Free Battle Mode, in which things can be customized without limits in terms of stages and rules. Blayzbloo also has a multiplayer variant of Free Battle Mode, where players can compete with other people who have downloaded the game to their DSi, up to four people per match.

External links
 BlazBlue: Battle x Battle  Official website for Japan

References

2010 video games
Arc System Works games
BlazBlue
DSiWare games
Nintendo DS-only games
Nintendo DS games
Fighting games
Multiplayer and single-player video games
Video games developed in Japan